Xerxes Peak, also known as Mount Xerxes, is a  mountain summit located in the Athabasca River valley of Jasper National Park, in the Canadian Rockies of Alberta, Canada. No name has been officially adopted yet for this peak. It is situated at the head of Fryatt Creek Valley on the same high ridge as Mount Christie, Brussels Peak, and Mount Lowell. The nearest higher peak is Karpathos Peak (Mount Olympus),  to the west.


History
The mountain was named in 1936 for the two kings of Persia, Xerxes I and Xerxes II.

The first ascent of the mountain was made in 1936 by Mr. and Mrs. A.W. Kramer, and A. McKay.

Geology
Xerxes Peak is composed of sedimentary rock laid down from the Precambrian to Jurassic periods, then pushed east and over the top of younger rock during the Laramide orogeny.

Climate
Based on the Köppen climate classification, Xerxes Peak is located in a subarctic climate with long, cold, snowy winters, and short mild summers. Temperatures can drop below -20° C with wind chill factors below -30° C. Precipitation runoff from Xerxes Peak drains into Fryatt Creek and Lick Creek, both tributaries of the Athabasca River.

See also
List of mountains in the Canadian Rockies

Gallery

References

External links
 Parks Canada web site: Jasper National Park

Two-thousanders of Alberta
Mountains of Jasper National Park
Alberta's Rockies
Canadian Rockies